|}

The Hungerford Stakes is a Group 2 flat horse race in Great Britain open to horses aged three years or older. It is run at Newbury over a distance of 7 furlongs (1,408 metres), and it is scheduled to take place each year in August.

History
The event is named after Hungerford, a town located several miles to the west of Newbury. It was established in 1949, and the inaugural running was contested over 1½ miles. The first winner was Star King (later renamed Star Kingdom).

The Hungerford Stakes was formerly held on Newbury's left-handed course, with a distance of about 7 furlongs and 64 yards. For a period it was classed at Group 3 level. It was switched to the straight track in 2002, and promoted to Group 2 status in 2006.

Records
Most successful horse (2 wins):
 Jimmy Reppin – 1968, 1969

Leading jockey (6 wins):
 Frankie Dettori – Inchinor (1993), Pollen Count (1994, dead-heat), Bin Rosie (1996), Decorated Hero (1997), Lend a Hand (1999), Shakespearean (2010)

Leading trainer (6 wins):
 John Gosden – Pollen Count (1994, dead-heat), Decorated Hero (1997), Muhtathir (1998), Sleeping Indian (2005), Gregorian (2013), Richard Pankhurst (2016)

Winners since 1979

Earlier winners

 1949: Star King *
 1950: Hyperbole
 1951: La Valeuse
 1952: Agitator
 1953: Olga
 1954: Tip the Bottle
 1955: Princely Gift
 1956: High Bhan
 1957: Picture Light
 1958: Lovestone
 1959: Agile
 1960: Fagus
 1961: Eagle
 1962: Romulus
 1963: Dunce Cap
 1964: Derring-Do
 1965: Roan Rocket
 1966: Silly Season
 1967: St Chad
 1968: Jimmy Reppin
 1969: Jimmy Reppin
 1970: Zingari
 1971: Welsh Pageant
 1972: Home Guard
 1973: Brook
 1974: Pitcairn
 1975: Court Chad
 1976: Ardoon
 1977: He Loves Me
 1978: Tannenberg

* The 1949 winner Star King was later exported to Australia and renamed Star Kingdom.

See also
 Horse racing in Great Britain
 List of British flat horse races

References
 Racing Post:

 galopp-sieger.de – Hungerford Stakes.
 horseracingintfed.com – International Federation of Horseracing Authorities – Hungerford Stakes (2018).
 pedigreequery.com – Hungerford Stakes – Newbury.
 

Flat races in Great Britain
Newbury Racecourse
Open mile category horse races
Recurring sporting events established in 1949